Otere Black (born 4 May 1995) is a New Zealand rugby union player who currently plays as a first five-eighth for  in the Mitre 10 Cup and the Blues in Super Rugby.

Domestic career

Manawatu
Black attended Hato Paora College for four years before moving on to Tū Toa where he graduated in 2013. He subsequently linked up with the local College Old Boys club. After scoring an impressive 223 points in sixteen games, he was promoted to the Manawatu Turbos ITM Cup side for 2014. His debut campaign with the Turbos was successful for both him and his team.

Hurricanes
Black was part of the Hurricanes' wider training group in 2015, but got a chance to make his Super Rugby debut after a knee injury sidelined incumbent number ten Beauden Barrett. He made four appearances for the Hurricanes, scoring 17 points, and impressing with his composure and general ability to run the game plan, particularly against the Blues at Eden Park.

With three other New Zealand Super Rugby clubs chasing his services for the 2016 Super Rugby season, Black decided to re-sign and continue developing his game under the Hurricanes coaching staff.

Blues
It was announced towards the end of the 2017 Super Rugby season that Black would move up north, signing to play for the Blues. After missing the 2018 Super Rugby season through injury Black made his debut for the franchise in the opening match of the 2019 Super Rugby season. He scored five points in a 22-24 loss to the   Crusaders .

International career

Māori All Blacks
Although the then 20-year-old Black had only played eleven matches for Manawatu, Colin Cooper, the Māori All Blacks coach, selected him for the 2015 tour to Fiji, playing against the Fiji national team, and against a specially made New Zealand Barbarians team.

Honours
Manawatu - 2014 ITM Cup Championship Division
Hurricanes - 2016 Super Rugby
Blues - 2021 Super Rugby Trans-Tasman

References

External links
 

1995 births
New Zealand rugby union players
New Zealand Māori rugby union players
Rugby union fly-halves
Manawatu rugby union players
Hurricanes (rugby union) players
Rugby union players from Palmerston North
Māori All Blacks players
Living people
Blues (Super Rugby) players
Bay of Plenty rugby union players
Urayasu D-Rocks players